Suissevale is a private subdivision in the town of Moultonborough in Carroll County, New Hampshire, United States. It is located between New Hampshire Route 109 and Moultonborough Bay, an arm of Lake Winnipesaukee. The subdivision is listed as a census-designated place (CDP) and had a year-round population of 328 as of the 2020 census.

Geography
Route 109 runs along the eastern edge of the community, leading northwest  to Moultonborough village and southeast  to Wolfeboro.

Demographics

As of the census of 2010, there were 249 people, 115 households, and 87 families residing in the CDP. There were 546 housing units, of which 431, or 78.9%, were vacant on Census Day (April 1). 419 of the vacant units were for seasonal or recreational use. The racial makeup of the CDP was 97.6% white and 2.4% two or more races. 0.4% of the population were Hispanic or Latino of any race.

Of the 115 households in the CDP, 20.0% had children under the age of 18 living with them, 60.0% were headed by married couples living together, 8.7% had a female householder with no husband present, and 24.3% were non-families. 17.4% of all households were made up of individuals, and 7.0% were someone living alone who was 65 years of age or older. The average household size was 2.17, and the average family size was 2.36.

15.7% of residents in the CDP were under the age of 18, 2.7% were from age 18 to 24, 15.6% were from 25 to 44, 45.3% were from 45 to 64, and 20.5% were 65 years of age or older. The median age was 52.6 years. For every 100 females, there were 84.4 males. For every 100 females age 18 and over, there were 87.5 males.

References

External links
Suissevale Property Owners Association

Census-designated places in New Hampshire
Census-designated places in Carroll County, New Hampshire
Populated places on Lake Winnipesaukee
Moultonborough, New Hampshire